Taxus canadensis, the Canada yew or Canadian yew, is a conifer native to central and eastern North America, thriving in swampy woods, ravines, riverbanks and on lake shores. Locally called simply "yew", this species is also referred to as American yew or ground-hemlock.

Most of its range is well north of the Ohio River. It is, however, found as a rare ice age relict in some coves of the Appalachian Mountains. The southernmost colonies are known from Ashe and Watauga Counties in North Carolina.

Description and ecology 
It is usually a sprawling shrub, rarely exceeding 2.5 m tall. It sometimes forms strong upright central leaders, but these cannot be formed from spreading branches, only from the original leader of the seedling plant. The shrub has thin scaly brown bark.

The seed cones are highly modified, each cone containing a single seed partly surrounded by a modified scale which develops into a soft, bright red berry-like structure called an aril, open at the end. The seeds are eaten by thrushes, waxwings and other birds, which disperse the (highly toxic) hard seeds undamaged in their droppings. The male cones are globose, 3 mm in diameter. It is a monoecious plant – one of the few in the genus.

Uses and traditions 
All parts of Canadian yew, save the aril, are toxic; it is, however, thought to be of lower toxicity than T. baccata.

Tribes in its native range used small quantities of yew leaf tea topically or internally for a variety of ailments – notably rheumatism. Tribes are also been said to have used yew twigs in steam baths to help alleviate rheumatism. Again, the plant is quite toxic and modern herbalists prefer safer, more effective herbs.

Taxus canadensis is also being harvested in northern Ontario, Québec and Atlantic Canada as the plant is a source of the class of poisonous chemicals known as taxanes, which have been a focus for cancer research. T. canadensis is much more abundant than the near-threatened Taxus brevifolia (Pacific yew), and the "greens" (new growth) can be harvested sustainably every five years, instead of stripping the bark and killing the plant.

The most abundant taxane in T. canadensis is 9-dihydro-13-acetylbaccatin III, which can be effectively converted to 10-deacetylbaccatin III, used in the production of paclitaxel. Two additional taxanes have been identified from T. canadensis, including 7β,10β,13α-triacetoxy-5α-(3'-dimethylamino-3'-phenylpropanoyl)oxy-2α-hydroxy-2(3→20)abeotaxa-4(20),11-dien-9-one and 2α,10β-diacetoxy-9α-hydroxy-5α-(3'-dimethylamino-3'-phenylpropanoyl)oxy-3,11-cyclotax-4(20)-en-13-one.

References

External links
 

canadensis
Least concern plants
Flora of West Virginia
Trees of the Northeastern United States
Plants described in 1785
Trees of Eastern Canada